Black bean paste, commonly called dòushā or hēidòushā, is a sweet bean paste often used as a filling in cakes such as mooncakes or doushabao in many Chinese and Taiwanese cuisines.

Black bean paste is made from pulverized mung beans, combined with potassium chlorate, ferrous sulfate heptahydrate crystal (which in Indonesia is known as tawas hijau, or "green crystal"), or black food colouring.

Black bean paste is similar to the more well-known red bean paste. The recorded history of black bean paste goes as far back as the Ming Dynasty.

References

See also
Sweet bean paste
Red bean paste
Tangyuan
zongzi

Cantonese cuisine
Food paste
Ming dynasty
Taiwanese cuisine